Sabancı may refer to;

People
Sabancı family, dynasty of Turkish businesspeople founded by Hacı Ömer Sabancı
Faruk Sabanci
Ali Sabancı
Hacı Sabancı
Mehmet Sabancı
Özdemir Sabancı
Şevket Sabancı

Places
Sabancı University, private research institution located in Istanbul, Turkey
Sakıp Sabancı Museum, private fine arts museum in Istanbul, Turkey
Sabancı Performing Arts Center, performing arts center and conference hall of Sabanci University in Istanbul, Turkey
Glass Pyramid Sabancı Congress and Exhibition Center, multi-purpose convention complex located in Antalya, Turkey

Other uses
Sabancı Holding, the second largest industrial and financial conglomerate in Turkey

Turkish-language surnames